The 21st Venice Biennale, held in 1938, was an exhibition of international contemporary art, with 18 participating nations. The Venice Biennale takes place biennially in Venice, Italy. Winners of the Gran Premi (Grand Prize) included Spanish painter Ignacio Zuloaga, Swiss sculptor Herman Hubacher, British etcher Blair Hughes-Stanton, and Italians painter Felice Casorati, sculptor Venanzio Crocetti, and etcher Mario Delitala.

References

Bibliography

Further reading 

 
 
 
 
 
 
 

1938 in art
1938 in Italy
Venice Biennale exhibitions